More Than a New Discovery is the debut album by Bronx-born singer, songwriter, and pianist Laura Nyro. It was recorded during 1966 and released early in following year on the Verve Folkways imprint of the Verve Records label.

The name of the label was later changed to Verve Forecast and the album was re-issued on that label as The First Songs in 1969. This re-issue has a different track order and revised cover design. It peaked at #97 on the Billboard 200, then known as the Pop Albums chart. Starting with this release the song "Hands Off the Man" was retitled "Flim Flam Man (Hands Off the Man)".

Columbia Records re-issued The First Songs with all-new cover art (featuring a rose illustration) in 1973.

In 1999, the album was inducted into the Grammy Hall of Fame. In 2008, Rev-Ola Records released a remastered version of the original album on Compact Disc with the original song order and the original cover art.

Production
Nyro signed a contract with Verve Folkways after she gained recognition when Peter Paul and Mary recorded her song "And When I Die" in 1966.

The album was recorded in the fall of 1966 with Herb Bernstein as arranger and Milton Okun producing. There was some uncertainty about Nyro's ability to lead the musicians by playing piano. As a result, pianist Stan Free was hired, and Nyro was encouraged to play the guitar instead, which she rejected.

Songs
"Wedding Bell Blues" was released as a single in September 1966 and remained on the "Bubbling Under" segment of the Billboard Hot 100 (then "Pop Singles") for 12 weeks, peaking at #103.

For the single version of "Stoney End", Nyro was forced to rework some of the lyrics that referred to the Bible, because Verve felt it would cause too much controversy.

The album included several songs that would become hits for other artists. Blood, Sweat & Tears scored with "And When I Die" (US #2), the 5th Dimension with "Wedding Bell Blues" (US #1) and "Blowin' Away" (US #21), and Barbra Streisand with "Stoney End" (US #6) and "Flim Flam Man" (US #82).

Track listing

More Than a New Discovery

The First Songs

Personnel
 Laura Nyro – guitar, keyboards, vocals, songwriter
 Jay Berliner – guitar
 Stan Free – piano
 Bill LaVorgna – drums
 Buddy Lucas – harmonica
 Lou Mauro – double bass
 James Sedlar – French horn
 Herb Bernstein – arranger, conductor, flugelhorn
Technical
 Milton Okun – producer
 Jean Goldhirsch – assistant producer
 Jerry Schoenbaum – production supervision
 Val Valentin – director of engineering
 Harry Yarmark – engineer
 Murray Laden – photography

References

Bibliography
 Michele Kort's biography Soul Picnic: The Music and Passion of Laura Nyro

External links
 
 
 Laura Nyro web site

1967 debut albums
Laura Nyro albums
Verve Forecast Records albums
Grammy Hall of Fame Award recipients
Albums produced by Milt Okun
Albums produced by Herb Bernstein
Albums arranged by Herb Bernstein
Albums conducted by Herb Bernstein